André Mercier was a French sports shooter. He competed at the 1900 Summer Olympics and the 1908 Summer Olympics.

References

External links
 

Year of birth missing
Year of death missing
French male sport shooters
Olympic shooters of France
Shooters at the 1900 Summer Olympics
Shooters at the 1908 Summer Olympics
Place of birth missing
Place of death missing